Hybauchenidium is a genus of dwarf spiders that was first described by Å. Holm in 1973.

Species
 it contains four species, found in Canada, Finland, Greenland, Russia, Sweden, and the United States:
Hybauchenidium aquilonare (L. Koch, 1879) (type) – Russia (Europe to Far North-East), USA (Alaska), Canada
Hybauchenidium cymbadentatum (Crosby & Bishop, 1935) – USA
Hybauchenidium ferrumequinum (Grube, 1861) – Sweden, Finland, Russia (Europe to Far North-East), Canada
Hybauchenidium gibbosum (Sørensen, 1898) – Russia (north-eastern Siberia, Far North-East), Canada, USA, Greenland

See also
 List of Linyphiidae species (A–H)

References

Araneomorphae genera
Linyphiidae
Spiders of North America
Spiders of Russia